Mohammad Hirzi Zulfaqar bin Mahzan (born 13 August 2000) is a Bruneian footballer who plays as a defender for DPMM FC of the Singapore Premier League.

Club career
Hirzi was a youth prospect who attended the National Football Association of Brunei Darussalam's grassroots development scheme the Tabuan Muda in 2015. He played for the Young Wasps' league side Tabuan Muda 'A' at the 2017–18 Brunei Super League.

After a period of focusing on his studies, Hirzi joined Indera SC for the 2022 Brunei FA Cup, the only competition held by FABD for the year. He helped Indera qualify for the knockout phase and played host to eventual winners DPMM FC in the quarter-finals.

Hirzi trialed and impressed at a local trial for new recruits for DPMM FC in January 2023 as part of preparations for their return to the Singapore Premier League in the 2023 season. He officially signed the terms on 28 February. He made his debut from the start against Tanjong Pagar United on 14 March, unfortunately scoring an own goal in his team's 2–1 victory.

International career
Hirzi's first youth international tournament was the 2015 AFF U-16 Youth Championship hosted by Cambodia in July–August, where he joined the likes of Wafi Aminuddin and Nur Asyraffahmi Norsamri in the starting lineup. The team only gained a single point in five matches, with Hirzi playing in all of them. Some of the players who impressed were drafted to the under-19s for the 2016 AFC U-19 Championship qualification matches held in Myanmar that September, overhauling the team that competed in the 2015 AFF U-19 Youth Championship the previous month. Hirzi played in three out of four games, all ending in defeats.

The next year, Hirzi laced up with the under-16s for the 2016 AFF U-16 Youth Championship held in Cambodia that July. He played four matches in the campaign, tasting defeats in all of them.

In July 2018, Hirzi was selected for the 2018 AFF U-19 Youth Championship tournament held in Indonesia along with the team of Tabuan Muda. He featured in all four group games at the tournament.

Personal life
Hirzi's brother Hijazi has represented Brunei in fencing in the men's foil category. He captained the football team of Laksamana College of Business at a national inter-college tournament in 2021 and became the winners of the competition.

References

External links

2000 births
Living people
Association football defenders
Bruneian footballers
Indera SC players
DPMM FC players
Singapore Premier League players